Ruth E. Malone is an American tobacco control researcher and policy analyst. She is professor in the Department of Social and Behavioral Sciences at the University of California, San Francisco School of Nursing. She has been the editor-in-chief of Tobacco Control since 2009. She holds the Mary Harms/Nursing Alumni Endowed Chair.

Education
Prof Malone completed a PhD at the University of California, San Francisco and a postdoctoral fellowship in health policy research at the PR Lee Institute for Health Policy Studies at UCSF.

Research
Malone is known for researching the activities of the tobacco industry with respect to public health, as well as the social construction of tobacco use. Specific tobacco-related subjects she has researched include the presence of smoking in video games in the absence of warnings, and the industry's efforts to fight attempts by Congress and military officials to raise the price of tobacco products for the military to that for civilians. Current work focuses on developing the research needed to advance an endgame for the tobacco epidemic.

References

Anti-smoking activists
University of California, San Francisco faculty
Living people
Medical journal editors
University of California, San Francisco alumni
Nursing researchers
American health activists
Year of birth missing (living people)